Mohamed El Amine Amoura (born 9 May 2000) is an Algerian professional footballer who plays as a winger for FC Lugano and the Algeria national team.

Club career
Amoura made his professional debut with ES Sétif in a 3–0 Algerian Ligue Professionnelle 1 win over CA Bordj Bou Arréridj on 17 February 2020, scoring his side's third goal after coming on as a late sub. He started the 2020–21 season in blistering form, finishing with 13 goals in 25 games.

International career
Amoura was called up to represent the Algeria A' national football team for a friendly in 17 June 2021. and scored four goals in a 5–1 win over Liberia.

Career statistics

Club

Honours

Club
 FC Lugano
 Swiss Cup (1): 2021–22

References

External links
 
 LFP.dz Profile

2000 births
Living people
People from Taher
Algerian footballers
Association football wingers
Algeria international footballers
Algerian Ligue Professionnelle 1 players
ES Sétif players
21st-century Algerian people
2021 Africa Cup of Nations players